Ahoah ("brotherly") was one of the sons of Bela, the son of Benjamin. He is also called Ahiah (ver. ) and Iri. His descendants were called Ahohites.

Books of Chronicles people